Erik K. Simonsen is an American musician and Republican Party politician who has represented the 1st Legislative District in the New Jersey General Assembly since January 14, 2020, after defeating incumbent Assemblymen R. Bruce Land and Matthew W. Milam in the 2020 general election. Simonsen served as Mayor of Lower Township from 2016 until 2020.

Simonsen is the athletic director at Lower Cape May Regional High School.

New Jersey Assembly  
Simonsen ran as a team with Mike Testa and Antwan McClellan. During the campaign, the team made immigration, and taxes a key part of their campaign. He, alongside Testa and McClellan, ousted the 1st District's legislators, Senator Bob Andrzejczak, Assemblymen R. Bruce Land and Matthew W. Milam. Their victories were the only gains Republicans made in the 2019 New Jersey elections.

Tenure 
Simonsen was sworn into office on January 14, 2020, when the 219th New Jersey Legislature convened.

Committee assignments 
Community Development and Affairs
Education
State and Local Government
Joint Committee on the Public Schools

District 1

New Jersey's 1st Legislative District encompasses parts of Atlantic County, New Jersey, Cumberland County, New Jersey, and all of Cape May County, New Jersey. Each of the 40 districts in the New Jersey Legislature has one representative in the New Jersey Senate and two members in the New Jersey General Assembly. The representatives from the 1st District for the 2022—2023 Legislative Session are:
Senator Mike Testa (R)
Assemblyman Antwan McClellan (R) 
Assemblyman Erik Simonsen (R)

Electoral history

General Assembly

References

External links
Legislative Webpage

Living people
Mayors of places in New Jersey
New Jersey Republicans
People from Lower Township, New Jersey
Rutgers University alumni
The College of New Jersey alumni
University of Scranton alumni
1968 births
21st-century American politicians